Sun Jiajun (born 1 August 2000) is a Chinese swimmer. He won the gold medal in the boys' 100-metre breaststroke and 4 × 100-metre mixed medley relay events at the 2018 Summer Youth Olympics held in Buenos Aires, Argentina. He also won the silver medal in the boys' 50-metre breaststroke and 4 × 100-metre medley relay categories in the same event. In 2021, he qualified to represent China in the men's 4 × 100-metre medley relay event at the 2020 Summer Olympics held in Tokyo, Japan.

References

  

2000 births
Living people
Chinese male breaststroke swimmers
People from Yichang
Swimmers at the 2018 Summer Youth Olympics
Youth Olympic gold medalists for China
Swimmers at the 2020 Summer Olympics
Olympic swimmers of China
21st-century Chinese people
Swimmers at the 2018 Asian Games